Topmost is an unincorporated community within Knott County, Kentucky, United States.

A 1981 coal mine explosion in Topmost killed eight miners.

References

Further reading

Unincorporated communities in Knott County, Kentucky
Unincorporated communities in Kentucky
Coal towns in Kentucky